Hernán Guillermo Soria (born 17 June 1997) is an Argentine professional footballer who plays as a centre-forward.

Career
Soria came through the youth system of Independiente Rivadavia, having signed with the club in 2004. He was moved into the senior set-up during the 2015 Primera B Nacional campaign, with Pablo Quinteros selecting Soria off the bench five times throughout. He played a total of one hundred and seven minutes in matches against Guaraní Antonio Franco, Atlético Paraná, Juventud Unida, Patronato and All Boys as they placed sixth. In 2016, Soria was sent out on loan to two Torneo Federal B clubs. Initially to Luján de Cuyo, where he featured seven times, and then to Jorge Newbery where he appeared in four games.

Soria didn't feature upon his return to Independiente, though was once on the substitutes bench for a Primera B Nacional match with Guillermo Brown on 8 April 2019. Ahead of January 2020, Soria departed to join La Consulta of Torneo Regional Federal Amateur on loan. He scored one goal in three fixtures, prior to terminating his stay there in order to sign for Torneo Federal A side Sol de Mayo on temporary terms. He appeared off the bench in matches against Deportivo Camioneros, Deportivo Maipú and Cipolletti in a season that was ended early due to the COVID-19 pandemic.

Career statistics
.

References

External links

1997 births
Living people
Place of birth missing (living people)
Argentine footballers
Association football forwards
Primera Nacional players
Torneo Federal A players
Independiente Rivadavia footballers
Asociación Atlética Luján de Cuyo players
Juventud Unida Universitario players
San Martín de Mendoza footballers